Dalrymple may refer to:
 Dalrymple (name), a surname and given name of Scottish origin
 Dalrymple baronets, a number of baronetcies created for people with the surname Dalrymple
 HMS Dalrymple (K427), frigate of the British Royal Navy
 Dalrymple's sign, a medical condition of the eyes associated with goitre

Places
 Mount Dalrymple, an Antarctic mountain

Australia
 Dalrymple, Queensland, the first inland town in northern Australia
 Dalrymple National Park, in Northern Queensland
 Electoral district of Dalrymple, Queensland, Australia
 Mount Dalrymple, Queensland, mountain in Queensland
 Shire of Dalrymple, former local government area in Northern Queensland
Port Dalrymple, name given to the mouth of the Tamar River in what is now George Town, Tasmania in 1798
 Port Dalrymple School, is a K-10 school in George Town, Tasmania
 Hundred of Dalrymple, land division in South Australia

Scotland
 Dalrymple, East Ayrshire, a small ex-mining village near the west coast of Scotland, in the Parish of Dalrymple
 Dalrymple, South Ayrshire, the part of the Parish of Dalrymple which falls in the adjacent South Ayrshire council area

See also
 Kate Dalrymple, a piece in the Scottish traditional music repertoire
 Lady Dalrymple (disambiguation)